The 1966 Michigan State Spartans football team represented Michigan State University in the 1966 Big Ten Conference football season. Michigan State lodged a 9–0–1 record, with a season-concluding tie against Notre Dame in the "game of the century", considered among the greatest games in college football history.

The College Football Researchers Association selected Michigan State as national champion, while the Helms Athletic Foundation, National Football Foundation (NFF), and Poling System selected them as co-national champion. Notre Dame was selected as national champion by the AP and Coaches polls.

Schedule

Personnel

Rankings

Game summaries

NC State

Penn State

at Illinois

Michigan

at Ohio State

Purdue

at Northwestern

Iowa

at Indiana

Notre Dame

    
    
    
    

The 1966 Michigan State vs. Notre Dame football game ("The Game of the Century") remains one of the greatest, and most controversial, games in college football history. The game was played in Michigan State's Spartan Stadium on November 19, 1966. Michigan State entered the contest 9–0 and ranked #2, while Notre Dame entered the contest 8–0 and ranked #1. Notre Dame elected not to try to score on its final series, thus the game ended in a 10–10 tie with both schools receiving national champion selections.

Team members in the NFL
 In the 1967 NFL Draft, four of the top eight picks in the draft were players from Michigan State.

References

Michigan State
Michigan State Spartans football seasons
College football national champions
Big Ten Conference football champion seasons
College football undefeated seasons
Michigan State Spartans football